Stitt Goes Latin is an  album by saxophonist Sonny Stitt recorded in 1963 and originally released on the Roost label.

Reception
The Allmusic site awarded the album 3 stars.

Track listing 
All compositions by Sonny Stitt except as indicated
 "Are You Listening" - 3:30   
 "Amigos" - 4:36   
 "My Little Suede Shoes" (Charlie Parker) - 4:04   
 "Ritmo Bobo" - 6:02   
 "I Told You So" - 5:20   
 "Chic" - 5:13   
 "Senor Jones" - 5:10   
 "Autumn Leaves" (Joseph Kosma, Jacques Prévert, Johnny Mercer) - 5:32

Personnel 
Sonny Stitt - alto saxophone, tenor saxophone
Thad Jones - trumpet
Chick Corea - piano 
Larry Gales - bass 
Willie Bobo - drums 
Carlos "Patato" Valdes - congas, bongos
Osvaldo "Chihuahua" Martinez - cowbell, maracas, jawbone

References 

1963 albums
Roost Records albums
Sonny Stitt albums
Albums produced by Teddy Reig